Ab Mahi or Ab-e Mahi may refer to:
 Ab Mahi, Fars
 Ab Mahi, Kohgiluyeh and Boyer-Ahmad